Muzeum Uniwersytetu Ekonomicznego w Krakowie is an economics museum of the Kraków University of Economics in Kraków, Poland. It was established in 2004.

Museums in Kraków
Museums established in 2004
University museums in Poland
Museums of economics